The 2011 AT&T Cotton Bowl Classic was the 75th edition of the annual post-season college football bowl game that was part of the 2010–11 bowl season of the 2010 NCAA Division I FBS football season. The game featured the LSU Tigers of the Southeastern Conference who defeated the Texas A&M Aggies of the Big 12 Conference by a score of 41–24. The game was scheduled for January 7, 2011 at 7:27 p.m. CST and was held at Cowboys Stadium in Arlington, Texas. This was the second time it was held in Cowboys Stadium after leaving its namesake venue. The game was broadcast by Fox.

Teams
The meeting between the Tigers and the Aggies was the 50th all-time between the teams, but the first since the 1995 season. It was the second time LSU and Texas A&M squared off in a bowl game, the first being the 1944 Orange Bowl.

LSU

It was the fifth Cotton Bowl Classic appearance for the Tigers and the first since the 2002 season. The Tigers are the conference statistics leader on pass defense (165.83 ypg). They are rated second in pass efficiency defense (112.94 rating), kickoff returns (25.79 avg.), punt returns (13.50 avg.), scoring defense (17.75 ppg), and total defense (301.67 ypg). Senior Josh Jasper has kicked 31 of 32 point-after-touchdowns, and 26 of 31 field goals for a total of 109 points.

Texas A&M

Texas A&M finished the 2010 season 9–3 after starting the season 3–3 and winning their final 6 games. Led by 3rd year head coach Mike Sherman and 1st year defensive coordinator/assistant head coach Tim DeRuyter, the team finished the season by beating 2 top 10 teams, Oklahoma and Nebraska, as well as in state rivals Baylor and Texas. The Aggies finished their conference schedule in a 3-way tie with Oklahoma and Oklahoma State. Oklahoma won the tiebreaker by having a higher BCS Ranking and eventually beat Nebraska in the Big 12 Championship.

It was Texas A&M's twelfth Cotton Bowl Classic appearance, tied for the second-most visits among any team. The Aggies' last trip to the Classic was in 2005 when they were defeated by Tennessee, 38–7. Overall Texas A&M holds a 5–8 record in the Cotton Bowl Classic, with their last win being a 41–13 victory over Oklahoma in 2013.

Game summary

Scoring summary

Statistics

See also
 LSU–Texas A&M football rivalry

References

Cotton Bowl Classic
Cotton Bowl Classic
LSU Tigers football bowl games
Texas A&M Aggies football bowl games
Cotton Bowl Classic
January 2011 sports events in the United States